The siege of Edessa took place in 165 when the Roman Empire, under Emperor Lucius Verus, besieged the city of Edessa, held by the Parthian Empire. 

Wa'el (son of Sahru), then ruler of Edessa and Osroene, had been installed by the Parthians in 163 and issued coins with the portrait of the Parthian king. As a result, Ma'nu VIII (son of Ma'nu VII) was forced to flee to the Romans.

During the 165 siege, the citizens of Edessa massacred the Parthian garrison of Edessa and opened its gates to the Romans. The Romans entered the city and Ma'nu VIII was reinstated by the Romans as ruler of Edessa/Osroene; he also received the epithet Philorhomaios ("Friend of the Romans").

As a result of the 165 siege, Edessa/Osroene repudiated its allegiance to the Parthians, and resubmitted itself to the Romans.

References

Sources
 
 
 
 

Edessa
Roman–Parthian Wars
Edessa
Osroene
Edessa
Edessa
2nd century in Iran
160s in the Roman Empire